Prevotella is a genus of Gram-negative bacteria.

Prevotella spp. are members of the oral, vaginal, and gut microbiota and are often recovered from anaerobic infections of the respiratory tract. These infections include aspiration pneumonia, lung abscess, pulmonary empyema, and chronic otitis media and sinusitis. They have been isolated from abscesses and burns in the vicinity of the mouth, bites, paronychia, urinary tract infection, brain abscesses, osteomyelitis, and bacteremia associated with upper respiratory tract infections. Prevotella spp. predominate in periodontal disease and periodontal abscesses.

Role in gut microbiota 
The human gut is mainly inhabited by two phyla of bacteria—Bacillota and Bacteroidota, the latter mostly dominated by Bacteroides and Prevotella genera. Prevotella and Bacteroides are thought to have had a common ancestor. Formally, the two genera were differentiated in 1990. However classification is ongoing. For example, Bacteroides melaninogenicus has been reclassified and split into Prevotella melaninogenica and Prevotella intermedia. Either Prevotella or Bacteroides dominate the gut and may be antagonistic. Prevotella is more common in non-Westernised populations consuming a plant-rich diet. In Western populations it has been associated with diets rich in fruits and vegetables. Genome analysis of Prevotella copri showed it was deficient in the ability to degrade host glycans and is more genetically equipped for plant glycan degradation. In a study of gut bacteria of children in Burkina Faso, Prevotella made up 53% of the gut bacteria but were absent in age-matched European children.

Long-term diet is reported to be associated with gut microbiome composition—those who eat protein and animal fats have predominantly Bacteroides bacteria, while those who consume more carbohydrates, especially fibre, feature Prevotella species.

Prevotella is associated with gut inflammation. Increased levels of P. copri might contribute to chronic inflammation in HIV patients. Single species isolate P. copri CB7 has been reported to be beneficial or detrimental, depending on context. Prevotella is a large genus with high species diversity and high genetic diversity across strains. Prevotella derived from humans expresses a diverse gene pool. In addition to genetic and overall microbiota differences, Prevotella's high genetic diversity makes it difficult to predict their function, which can vary across individuals.

Vaginal microbiota 
Prevotella species may be commensal in the vagina, though increased abundance of Prevotella in vaginal mucosa is associated with bacterial vaginosis. Prevotella is the most heritable bacterial group in vaginal microbiome and its abundance is linked to body mass index and hormonal milieu. Prevotella bivia produces lipopolysaccharides and ammonia that are part of vaginal mucus. It is also associated with epithelial cytokine production and enhances the growth of other bacterial vaginosis-associated organisms, such as Gardnerella vaginalis. The latter in turn was found to stimulate growth of P. bivia.

Pathogenicity 
P. intermedia and P. nigrescens are associated with inflammatory periodontal diseases, such as pregnancy gingivitis, acute necrotizing ulcerative gingivitis and adult periodontitis. Together with Porphyromonas gingivalis they are known as black-pigmenting anaerobes. All three require haemin to provide iron for their growth. These species were shown to bind lactoferrin that is released together with the contents of neutrophils during inflammation and bleeding in periodontitis patients. Lactoferrin inhibits the growth of P. gingivalis but not Prevotella. Inorganic iron and iron-binding proteins such as transferrin and lactoferrin do not support the growth of P. intermedia, however hemin–iron-containing compounds which include hemin, human hemoglobin, bovine hemoglobin, and bovine catalase stimulate the growth of P. intermedia. Hemoglobin-binding protein on the cell surface of P.intermedia has been described.

Some studies have linked abnormal levels of Prevotella copri and rheumatoid arthritis.

An overgrowth of Prevotella and a reduction of Lactobacillus correlated with the onset of osteomyelitis in mice. The reduction of Prevotella in model mice led to an increase of Lactobacillus showing a protection effect against osteomyelitis. Thus, changes in the Prevotella microbiota may be related to the development of osteomyelitis.

Approximately 70% and 30% of Prevotella are resistant to penicillin and clindamycin, respectively, while resistance to amoxicillin/clavulanate and metronidazole is reported in less than 10% of the clinical strains responsible for bloodstream infections in humans.

Species 

 Prevotella albensis
 Prevotella amnii
 Prevotella bergensis
 Prevotella bivia
 Prevotella brevis
 Prevotella bryantii
 Prevotella buccae
 Prevotella buccalis
 Prevotella copri
 Prevotella dentalis
 Prevotella denticola
 Prevotella disiens
 Prevotella histicola
 Prevotella intermedia
 Prevotella maculosa
 Prevotella marshii
 Prevotella melaninogenica
 Prevotella micans
 Prevotella multiformis
 Prevotella nigrescens
 Prevotella oralis
 Prevotella oris
 Prevotella oulorum
 Prevotella pallens
 Prevotella salivae
 Prevotella stercorea

 Prevotella timonensis
 Prevotella veroralis

See also
 Enterotype
 List of bacterial vaginosis microbiota

References 

Bacteroidia
Gut flora bacteria
Infections with a predominantly sexual mode of transmission
Bacteria genera